Arthur Stevens (May 1, 1915 – May 22, 2007) was an animator, director and producer for Walt Disney Productions.

Career
Art Stevens was an animator at Walt Disney Productions during the Golden Age of American Animation. Stevens began his career inbetweening on the 1940 film Fantasia. After doing in-between work on several films, he received his first screen credit in 1953 as a character animator on Peter Pan. During his career, Stevens contributed to the storyboards and animation in many Disney cartoon shorts and feature films including Ward Kimball's critically acclaimed 1950s television documentaries Man in Space, Man and the Moon and Mars and Beyond. Stevens was also an animator on the Oscar-winning shorts Toot, Whistle, Plunk and Boom (1953) and It's Tough to Be a Bird (1969).

In 1977, Stevens co-directed The Rescuers. He then co-produced and co-directed The Fox and the Hound (1981) and contributed story work during early production of The Black Cauldron (1985).

Stevens retired in 1983, after 43 years at the Disney animation studio.

Personal life
Stevens was born in Roy, Montana. He was married to his wife, Penny, for 68 years, with whom he had two sons Craig and Kent. Stevens died of a heart attack in Studio City, California in 2007.

Filmography as director
The Rescuers (1977)
The Fox and the Hound (1981)

References

External links

1915 births
2007 deaths
American animators
American film producers
American animated film directors
American animated film producers
Walt Disney Animation Studios people
Artists from Montana
Film directors from Montana